Crowders Mountain Township is a township in southwestern Gaston County, North Carolina, United States. At the 2010 census, it had a population of 15,821.

The township contains the city of Bessemer City, a western portion of the city of Gastonia, and an eastern portion of the city of Kings Mountain. The township takes its name from Crowder's Mountain, a  ridge in the western part of the township and home to Crowders Mountain State Park.

References

Townships in Gaston County, North Carolina
Townships in North Carolina